Erra (stylized as ERRA) is an American progressive metalcore band from Birmingham, Alabama, formed in 2009. The band was named after the homonymous Akkadian god of war and plague. The band has released five studio albums and three EPs to date. Their latest album, titled Erra, was released on March 19, 2021. They have toured with bands such as As I Lay Dying, August Burns Red, TesseracT, Born of Osiris, Ice Nine Kills, Glass Cloud, Within the Ruins and Texas in July.

History

Early years and Impulse (2009–2011)
Erra was formed in 2009 by high school friends Alex Ballew, Jesse Cash, Adam Hicks, Garrison Lee and Alan Rigdon in Birmingham, Alabama. The band wrote and self-released two EPs: a self-titled in 2009 and Andromeda in 2010. This gained the attention of Tragic Hero Records, which had signed them in 2011. Later that year, the band released their first studio album Impulse and toured with bands such as Born of Osiris and Upon a Burning Body.

Augment and line-up changes (2012–2014)
In 2012, Adam Hicks left the band to pursue other career options and the band began writing their second studio album with Cash tracking both guitar and bass for the album. Augment was released and gained the band considerably more attention from touring bands, and they began touring more extensively. Hicks was replaced by guitarist Sean Price, who was included in the "Hybrid Earth" music video. The band toured the following year to promote their second release. Vocalist Garrison Lee and guitarist Alan Rigdon announced their departure from the band in 2014 and left on good terms.

Moments of Clarity and Drift (2014–2017)
Following the end of their record deal with Tragic Hero, Erra signed to Sumerian Records in mid-2014. Bassist Sean Price moved to rhythm guitar and vocalist Ian Eubanks replaced Garrison Lee's position. In 2014, their third EP Moments of Clarity was released through Sumerian. It reached No. 1 on the Billboard Heatseekers Albums chart. Throughout 2015, Erra opened up for bands such as August Burns Red on their Frozen Flame Tour and TesseracT on their 2015 Polaris album tour. In late 2015, Eubanks parted ways with the band, citing an impact on his health as the main reason.

In 2016, vocalist J.T. Cavey, a former member of Texas in July, joined the band to replace Ian Eubanks's position. Cavey and the band entered the studio and wrote and released their third studio album Drift. The album reached No. 1 on the Billboard Heatseekers Albums chart. The band toured on the Sumerian 10-year tour, along with Born of Osiris, Veil of Maya, After the Burial and Bad Omens.

Neon (2018–2019)
On June 12, 2018, the band issued the first single from their album Neon. The album was released on August 10, 2018, and is the band's third release on the label Sumerian Records, and the second album to feature J.T. Cavey on vocals. It peaked at No. 1 on the US Billboard 200s Heatseekers Albums chart. In September 2018, the band departed on tour with After the Burial and The Acacia Strain.

On August 8, 2019, the band released a new single titled "Eye of God"; it was made available to pre-save. In August 2019, Erra went on the Neon/Alien tour through North America with Northlane, Crystal Lake and Currents. On October 10, the band released their cover of Queens of the Stone Age's "You Think I Ain't Worth a Dollar, But I Feel Like a Millionaire" on streaming music services.

Self-titled fifth album (2020–present)
On August 27, 2020, the band announced that they had parted ways with Sumerian Records and signed with UNFD, and they released a new single "Snowblood" along with a corresponding music video. On November 19, the band released another single "House of Glass".

On January 13, 2021, the band released the third single "Divisionary" along with an accompanying music video. That same day, the band revealed the tracklist, album's official artwork and announced that their new upcoming self-titled fifth studio album is set for release on March 19, 2021. On February 3, one and a half months before the album's release, the band unveiled the fourth single, "Scorpion Hymn". On March 11, the band released the fifth single, "Shadow Autonomous". On September 10, just under six months after the album's original release, the band released an instrumental version of the album.

On October 7, the band unveiled a new version of the song "Vanish Canvas" featuring Courtney LaPlante of Spiritbox along with its music video. On January 21, 2022, the band released the seventh single "Nigh to Silence" while also announcing the deluxe edition of the album which is set to be released on March 18. At the same time, the band officially revealed the album cover and the track list. On February 23, one month before the release, the band released their cover of Muse's "Stockholm Syndrome" on streaming music services. On March 28, the band announced that guitarist Sean Price departed from the band on good terms.

On July 7, the band released a new single titled "Pull from the Ghost", shortly before the band's headlining tour throughout July and August of the same name with bands Alpha Wolf, Thornhill, and Invent Animate. On December 1, Erra featured on PhaseOne's single "World Unknown".

Musical style and influences
The band has been referred to as "the spearhead of the whole modern/progressive metalcore movement" and have referred to their own style as "melodic-ambient."

They have cited August Burns Red, Misery Signals, Born of Osiris, and Saosin as musical influences. Cove Reber of Saosin and Anthony Green of Circa Survive have been noted as a particular influence on Jesse Cash's vocals.

 Members Current Alex Ballew – drums, percussion (2009–present)
 Jesse Cash – guitars, clean vocals (2009–present); bass (2014–2016)
 J.T. Cavey – lead vocals (2016–present)
 Conor Hesse – bass (2016–present)Touring Blakeley Townson – bass (2015–2016)
 Dustin Davidson – guitars (2021)
 Clint Tustin – guitars (2022–present)Former Adam Hicks – bass (2009–2012)
 Garrison Lee – unclean vocals (2009–2014)
 Alan Rigdon – guitars, backing vocals (2009–2014)
 Ian Eubanks – unclean vocals (2014–2015)
 Sean Price – guitars (2014–2022); bass (2012–2016)Timeline'

Discography

Studio albums

Extended plays

Singles

As featured artist

References

Metalcore musical groups from Alabama
2009 establishments in Alabama
Musical groups established in 2009
Sumerian Records artists
Musical quintets
Musical groups from Birmingham, Alabama
Tragic Hero Records artists
UNFD artists